Karl Friedrich Bernhard Schreiber (September 19, 1833 – March 5, 1894) was a German architect.

About
Schreiber studied at the Dresden Art Academy with Georg Hermann Nicolai . Between 1858 and 1866 he worked in partnership with the architect Ernst Giese . He was known for a "close connection to Nicolai " and for the "early use of the German Renaissance".

Schreiber died in Dresden in 1894 and was buried in the Old Annen Cemetery.

Notable works
1862/1870: Gauernitz , reconstruction of the castle in the style of the Saxon Renaissance Revival Architecture (with Ernst Giese)
1868: Dresden, conversion of the “Lodge to the bronze pillars” at Bautzner Strasse 19 in the style of the Nicolai school with a pilaster architecture
1868/1869: Dresden, Villa Pilz , Parkstrasse 4
1872/1874: Dresden, Villa Tasch , Bernhardstrasse 6
1871/1873: Dresden, Albert Theater
1872/1874: Dresden, Palais Kap-herr , Parkstrasse 7
1872/1874: Teplitz , Altes Stadttheater (construction management: Hermann Rudolph )
1884/1885: Constappel , conversion of the Constappel church

Literature

References

External links
Bernhard Schreiber in Stadtwiki Dresden

1833 births
1894 deaths
19th-century German architects
Dresden Academy of Fine Arts
People from Dresden